Grijzegrubben is a hamlet in the municipality of Beekdaelen in the province of Limburg, the Netherlands.

The name Grijzegrubben contains the toponym Grubbe, which in Limburg often refers to a hollow way.
The name was already in use in the year 1637, when Aleidis of Grijzegrubben leased some land to the nobleman Bartholomeus van Reymersbeeck.
Archeologists found in Grijzegrubben in August 2002 the remains of a Roman farm or storehouse, originating from approximately the 2nd century.

In September 1944, a tree with a Christian cross was accidentally destroyed by an American armoured car.
Due to the cross and the preservation of Grijzegrubben during World War II, community members built a chapel at this spot in 1945. The chapel is still owned by the community.

Grijzegrubben has place name signs. It was home to 229 people in 1840. Nowadays, it consists of about 100 houses.

The Southern Limburg horse market is held each year in Grijzegrubben since 2005.

References

 Community Grijzegrubben Official website 
 Hoven, Frank van den (2003) Op ontdekkingsreis door Zuid-Limburg : Reisgids en naslagwerk voor toeristen en streekbewoners (Filatop Streekreeks nr.3). , p. 420 
 The chapel of Grijzegrubben 

Populated places in Limburg (Netherlands)
Beekdaelen